King's Highway 127, commonly referred to as Highway 127, is a provincially maintained highway in the Canadian province of Ontario. The route begins in Maynooth, connecting Highway 62 north of Bancroft with Highway 60 in the township of South Algonquin, east of Whitney and Algonquin Provincial Park. The entire route is patrolled by the Ontario Provincial Police (OPP).

Highway 127 was designated in late 1955, generally following the same route as today, with the exception of the northern terminus. During the early 1960s, a new road was constructed east of Whitney, bypassing the old highway for several kilometres. By 1963, the bypass was complete and Highway 127 was rerouted onto it.

Route description 
Highway 127 is a remote connector highway that lies east of Algonquin Park, the oldest provincial park in Ontario and one of the most frequented camping grounds in the world. It connects the northern end of Highway 62 in Maynooth with Highway 60 east of Whitney. The only community Highway 127 passes through is Lake St. Peter. It passes through large swaths of undeveloped forest on its  journey, and is rather remote; aside from the towns at the northern and southern terminii, the only named community on Highway 127 is Lake St. Peter.

Like most routes which pass through the Canadian Shield, Highway 127 travels through rock cuts and muskeg-ridden terrain in the midst of dense coniferous forests. There is little agricultural activity along the route. Within Maynooth, Highway 127 serves nearly three times as many vehicles as the rest of the route; while a daily average of 1800 vehicles use Highway 127 in Maynooth, only 650 travel the length of the route. As with other provincial highways in Ontario, Highway 127 is patrolled by the OPP.

History 
Highway 127 was first designated in 1955 along an existing road between Maynooth and Whitney. The section within the Hastings County was designated on October 19 and the section within Nipissing District on November 16.
It was paved as far north as Lake St. Peter, after which it was a gravel road.
Over the next several years, the highway was paved north towards Whitney. In the early 1960s, it was decided to bypass to the east of the northernmost section of the highway.
Aside from minor realignments, the route of Highway 127 has not changed since then.

Major intersections

References

External links 

 Highway 127 at onthighways.com

127